Tobin Mesa is a large mesa in the Mesa Range, between Pain Mesa on the north and Gair Mesa on the south. Named by the Northern Party of New Zealand Geological Survey Antarctic Expedition (NZGSAE), 1962–63, for James Tobin, surveyor with this party.

Mesas of Antarctica
Landforms of Victoria Land
Pennell Coast